Waine Bacon (born April 11, 1979) is a former American football cornerback in the National Football League. He was drafted by the Atlanta Falcons in the sixth round of the 2003 NFL Draft. He played college football at the University of Alabama.

References

1979 births
Living people
Players of American football from Washington, D.C.
American football cornerbacks
Indianapolis Colts players
Alabama Crimson Tide football players